Mordella seriata is a species of beetle in the genus Mordella of the family Mordellidae, which is part of the superfamily Tenebrionoidea. It was discovered in 1891.

References

Beetles described in 1891
seriata